Diplodocoidea is a superfamily of sauropod dinosaurs, which included some of the longest animals of all time, including slender giants like Supersaurus, Diplodocus, Apatosaurus, and Amphicoelias. Most had very long necks and long, whip-like tails; however, one family (the dicraeosaurids) are the only known sauropods to have re-evolved a short neck, presumably an adaptation for feeding low to the ground. This adaptation was taken to the extreme in the highly specialized sauropod Brachytrachelopan. A study of snout shape and dental microwear in diplodocoids showed that the square snouts, large proportion of pits, and fine subparallel scratches in Apatosaurus, Diplodocus, Nigersaurus, and Rebbachisaurus suggest ground-height nonselective browsing; the narrow snouts of Dicraeosaurus, Suuwassea, and Tornieria and the coarse scratches and gouges on the teeth of Dicraeosaurus suggest mid-height selective browsing in those taxa. This taxon is also noteworthy because diplodocoid sauropods had the highest tooth replacement rates of any vertebrates, as exemplified by Nigersaurus, which had new teeth erupting every 30 days.

Most diplodocoids belong to Diplodocimorpha, a name first used by Calvo & Salgado (1995), who defined it as "Rebbachisaurus tessonei sp. nov., Diplodocidae, and all descendants of their common ancestor." The group was not used often, and was synonymized with Diplodocoidea as the groups were often found to have the same content. In 2005, Mike P. Taylor and Darren Naish reviewed diplodocoid phylogeny and taxonomy, and realized that Diplodocimorpha could not be synonymized with Diplodocoidea. Whereas the former was defined node-based, the latter was branch-based. Haplocanthosaurus and possibly Amphicoelias are non-diplodocimorph diplodocoids.

Taxonomy

The below taxonomy follows the study of Emanuel Tschopp, Octavio Mateus and Roger Benson, 2015:

Diplodocoidea
Haplocanthosaurus
Diplodocimorpha
Rebbachisauridae
Flagellicaudata
Dicraeosauridae
Diplodocidae
Amphicoelias
Apatosaurinae
Diplodocinae

The phylogenetics of Diplodocoidea were reviewed in 2015 with a specimen-level phylogenetic analysis, as well as a species-level analysis. Their cladistic analysis is shown below.

References

 
Neosauropoda